The following is a list of events affecting Philippine television in 2013. Events listed include television show debuts, finales, cancellations, birthdays, anniversaries, and channel launches, closures and rebrandings, as well as information about controversies and carriage disputes.

Events

January
January 23: GMA Northern Mindanao was finally launched as the 7th originating station of Kapuso Network, which covers Northern Mindanao and Caraga as well as parts of Zamboanga Peninsula. On February 5, it moved form Channel 12 to Channel 35 with the launched of its flagship local newscast Testigo Northern Mindanao.

February
 February 9 – JR Royol wins MasterChef Pinoy Edition.

March
 March 21 – Kris Aquino appeared in a 30-minute interview with TV Patrol to announce her resignation from all her ABS-CBN shows to spend time with her youngest son. She also revealed that James Yap made sexual advances on her inside her room, which she refused. She said Yap threatened her in the presence of Bimby, who was traumatized of the said incident. Aquino also filed a temporary protection order on March 20, 2013. In the petition, Kris asked the court to order Yap to stay away from her, her 5-year-old son Bimby and any household member, keep a distance of at least 100 meters, and to stay away from her residence, school, place of employment or any place frequented by her and her son.

April
 April 11 – TV5's parent company MediaQuest Holdings has announced that it will not renew its blocktime agreement with the government network Intercontinental Broadcasting Corporation under the AKTV primetime sports block, when AKTV ceased airing on May 31.
 April 13 – Isabel Granada and Kapamilya was hailed as Bida Kapamilya Celebrity Round Grand Champion on It's Showtime.
 April 14 – Ariella Arida, Bea Rose Santiago, Joanna Cindy Miranda, Mutya Johanna Datul and Pia Wurtzbach were crowned as the new Binibining Pilipinas winners. Arida was crowned by Miss Universe 2012 1st runner-up Janine Tugonon as the new Miss Universe–Philippines 2013. Santiago was crowned as the new Binibining Pilipinas–International 2013 by the outgoing titleholder Nicole Schmitz. Miranda as the new Binibining Pilipinas–Tourism 2013 crowned by Katrina Jayne Dimaranan. Datul was crowned as the new Binibining Pilipinas–Supranational 2013 by Miss Supranational 2012 3rd runner-up Elaine Kay Moll. Wurtzbach ended as the Binibining Pilipinas 2013 1st runner-up.

May
 May 11 – Agravante Family from Brgy. Pagsawitan, Sta. Cruz, Laguna hailed as Bida Kapamilya Round 2 grand champion on It's Showtime.
 May 13–14 – All Philippine TV networks will have for a special coverage of the 2013 mid-term elections.
 May 31 – After two years of broadcast, AKTV on IBC 13 ceased operations on Friday evening.

June
 June 1 – Christopher de Leon's look-alike (Jonathan Garcia from Quezon City) wins as Ultimate Kalokalike on It's Showtime.
 June 8 – 13-year-old singer Roel Manlangit wins the fourth season of Pilipinas Got Talent.
 June 9 – Goin' Bulilit introduces the nine new cast members such as JB Agustin, Lance Lucido, CX Navarro, Aldred Nasayao, Jillian Aguila, Aaliyah Belmoro, Allyson McBride, Ashley Sarmiento and Kazumi Porquez.
 June 10 – The controversial drama My Husband's Lover began airing on GMA Network which tackles homosexual relationships between men.
 June 22 – Super Crew was hailed as Bida Kids Grand Champion on It's Showtime.

August
 August 3 – Video snippets of Chito Miranda having sexual intercourse with Neri Naig, and two other women in three different occasions appeared in YouTube. The video snippets with the other two women were taken down the same day, but the one with Naig became a viral hit that was shared in different blogs and social media sites. On his Twitter account, Miranda said his room was recently robbed. Among those stolen was his hard disk drive, where photo and video files were stored. On Parokya ni Edgar's Facebook page and on Miranda's Instagram page, Miranda expressed his sadness on the leaking of the private video. He also asked for forgiveness from both his and Naig's families. A second more graphic clip, which is 11 minutes and 20 seconds long, different from the first video that spread in August was uploaded Monday afternoon on a Facebook page.
 August 18 – Former actress Megan Young crowned as Miss World Philippines 2013 at the Solaire Resort & Casino in Parañaque

September
 September 2 – An alleged sex scandal of Wally Bayola and EB Babes dancer, Yosh Rivera, went viral in social media sites. The video, in which both of them are seen engaging in sexual intercourse, was uploaded onto YouTube that night. The video was immediately removed from the site but it was already circulated to other sites such as Facebook. After the scandal became known, the two of them have not appeared on Eat Bulaga! since. It was reported that Bayola will temporarily not be appearing on Eat Bulaga!, as stated by his manager, Malou Choa Fagar who said the comedian "will lie low from the program".
 September 7 – Mutya Johanna Datul was crowned Miss Supranational 2013 and is the first Asian and first Filipina to win the title.
 September 14
 TV5 marks the launching of the new programming blocks Weekend Do It Better and Everyday All The Way.
 Rizal Underground hailed as Bida Kabarkada Grand Champion on It's Showtime.
 September 28
 Miss Philippines Megan Young was crowned Miss World 2013 and is the first Filipina to win the title.
 Nicki Minaj's look-alike (Jennifer Katayong from Pasay) wins as Ultimate Kalokalike Face 2 on It's Showtime.
 September 29: 
 A fire hits the basement of GMA Network Center in Quezon City, the headquarters of GMA Network, one of the country's largest TV network. Although there were no injuries, it caused technological difficulties to the transmissions of both GMA and GMA News TV.
 Mitoy Yonting wins the first season of The Voice of the Philippines.

October
 October 5–6 – ABS-CBN marks its 60th Anniversary of the Philippine Television with the Grand Kapamilya Weekend held at the Quezon City Memorial Circle, Smart Araneta Coliseum and Marikina Sports Complex.
 October 19 – Filipino-Chinese Francis Ryan Lim was hailed as Pinoy Halo-Halo Grand Winner on It's Showtime.
 October 20 – Eduardo Gaeilo Pajinag, Jr. wins the top prize of 2 Million pesos of Who Wants to Be a Millionaire?.
 October 26 – Team Teddy, Karylle and Jugs hailed as the 4th anniversary champion on It's Showtime.
 October 31 – OMNI Digital Media Ventures (an affiliate of Solar Entertainment Corporation) launched a video-on-demand streaming service to access Hollywood blockbusters and episodes of TV series, Blink.

November
 November 9 – Miss Philippines Ariella Arida won third runner-up in the Miss Universe 2013 in Moscow Oblast, Russia.
 November 16 – HMN hailed as Jambunganga Grand Winner on It's Showtime.
 November 30 – ETC returned to SBN-21 after 2 years broadcast on RPN-9.

December
 December 1 – Solar News Channel transferred to Radio Philippines Network after ETC return to Southern Broadcasting Network.
 December 2 – UNTV introduces drone technology, the first in Philippine television.
 December 17 – Miss Philippines Bea Rose Santiago won Miss International 2013 held in Tokyo, Japan.
 December 23 – The network began broadcasting from its new headquarters, the 6,000-sqm TV5 Media Center located in Reliance, Mandaluyong.

Debuts

Unknown dates
 July: The Snow Queen on Net 25

Unknown
Something to Chew On on Solar News Channel
Ben 10 Ultimate Alien on TV5
Dayo on AksyonTV
Gargoyles on TV5
Regular Show on TV5
Sym-Bionic Titan on TV5
The Amazing World of Gumball on TV5
The Misadventures of Flapjack on TV5
Power Rangers Super Samurai on ABS-CBN 2
ETC Flix on ETC

Returning or renamed programs

Programs transferring networks

Finales

Unknown

Networks

Launches

Stations changing network affiliation
The following is a list of television stations that have made or will make noteworthy network affiliation changes in 2013.

Rebranded
The following is a list of television stations or cable channels that have made or will make noteworthy network rebrands in 2013.

Closures

Winners
These are awards held in 2013.

Local
This list only includes the Golden Screen TV Awards and Star Awards for Television.

International
This list only includes the International Emmys and the Asian Television Awards.

Deaths
January 24: Pepe Pimentel, TV host
February 6: Henry Halasan, news director
February 9: Elvie Villasanta, actress & comedian, mother of Ariel Villasanta
March 14: Subas Herrero, actor, double pneumonia (born 1943)
May 12: Tita Swarding, radio personality (born 1952)
May 19: Bella Flores, 84, actress
May 28: Eddie Romero, 88, director, National Artist of the Philippines for Theater and Film.
June 24: Louella Yap Chiu, 50, Mother of Kim Chiu
June 26: Sammy Lagmay, 55, former comedian
July 5: Ama Quiambao, 65, actress
September 13: Nora Daza, veteran gourmet chef, restaurateur, socio-civic leader and television host, 84, pneumonia
September 15: Julius Camba, reporter, 28, car accident
November 2: Renato del Prado, 73, Character Actor, colon cancer 
November 24: June Keithley-Castro, 66, broadcast journalist

See also
2013 in television

References

 
Television in the Philippines by year
Philippine television-related lists